Gerald Raymond Dunn (December 20, 1934March 22, 2005) was a Michigan politician.

Early life
Dunn was born on December 20, 1934 in Saginaw, Michigan to parents Roy and Mae Dunn. Dunn graduated from Central Michigan University with a bachelor's degree and did graduate work at the University of Michigan.

Career
On November 4, 1964, Dunn was elected to the Michigan Senate where he represented the 25th district from January 13, 1965 to 1966. He was not re-elected in 1966. In 1968, Dunn was a delegate to the Democratic National Convention from Michigan. Dunn served as a member of University of Michigan board of regents from 1969 to 1984.

Personal life
Dunn was married Patricia A. Luptowski in 1958. Together they had four children. Dunn later married Marilyn C. Dunn.

Death
Dunn died of cancer on March 22, 2005 in Garden City, Michigan. Dunn donated his body to the University of Michigan Medical School Department of Anatomy.

References

1934 births
2005 deaths
Democratic Party Michigan state senators
People from Saginaw, Michigan
Regents of the University of Michigan
Central Michigan University alumni
20th-century American politicians
20th-century American academics